Petra Frey (born 27 June 1978, in Wattens), is an Austrian singer. She has released twelve studio albums and five compilation albums and participated in the Eurovision Song Contest.

Biography
Frey released her debut album, Bloß Träume im Kopf in 1993. Petra represented Austria in the Eurovision Song Contest in 1994 with the song "Für den Frieden der Welt" (For the peace of the world), which came 17th in the international final. She also came second in the Austrian national final in 2003 with the song This Night Should Never End. In 2007, after a few years break, Petra returned to the schlager scene with her new album Göttlich weiblich, her first on the DA Records label. Petra attempted to represent Austria at Eurovision again in 2011, with Send a Little Smile, but she failed to qualify from the Internet semi final stage.

Since September 2014 she is jury member at the talent-show Die große Chance.

Her Twelfth studio album Einfach Frey was released in April 2011, and she continues to have success in the schlager market to this day.

Discography
Studio Albums
 1993 – Bloß Träume im Kopf
 1995 – Hey Du
 1996 – Liebst Du mich
 1998 – Küß mich…
 1999 – Heiß und kalt
 2001 – Geboren um Dich zu lieben
 2002 – Das ist mein Leben
 2004 – Freyheiten
 2007 – Göttlich weiblich
 2008 – Selbstbewusst
 2009 – Feuer und Eis
 2011 – Einfach Frey

Compilations
 1998 – Herz in Sicht
 2001 – Made in Austria
 2003 – Meine Erfolge
 2003 – Nimm mein Herz
 2010 – Meine Besten

References

1978 births
Living people
21st-century Austrian women singers
Eurovision Song Contest entrants for Austria
Eurovision Song Contest entrants of 1994
People from Innsbruck-Land District
20th-century Austrian women singers